Benjamin N. Maltz (1901-1993) was an American banker and philanthropist. He was the first Chairman of the City National Bank.

Early life
Benjamin N. Maltz was born in 1901 in Chicago, Illinois. He started his career as a whisky broker in Chicago.

Banking career
In 1954, Maltz was hired as the first Chairman of the Board of City National Bank, a new bank founded by Alfred S. Hart based in Beverly Hills, California. Over the years, the bank became known as the "bank of the stars," bankrolling many American movie stars.

Philanthropy

Maltz made many charitable donations during his lifetime, believing that those who have been successful must give back to their community. Nowadays, the Ben Maltz Gallery at the Otis College of Art and Design is named in his honour. So is the Maltz Park, located on the corner of Sunset Boulevard and Whittier Drive in Beverly Hills, California.

Personal life
His daughter, Elaine (Maltz) Goldsmith, married Bram Goldsmith, who became the Chairman of City National Bank. Their son, Russell Goldsmith, serves as the current Chairman.

Death
Maltz died in 1993.

References

1901 births
1993 deaths
Businesspeople from Chicago
People from Beverly Hills, California
American bankers
American chief executives
Philanthropists from Illinois
20th-century American businesspeople
20th-century American philanthropists